Karl-Ernst Schottes (born 21 April 1935) is a German hurdler. He competed in the men's 110 metres hurdles at the 1960 Summer Olympics.

References

1935 births
Living people
Athletes (track and field) at the 1960 Summer Olympics
German male hurdlers
Olympic athletes of the United Team of Germany
Place of birth missing (living people)